Dan B. Shields (August 9, 1878 – January 4, 1970) was an American politician who served as the Attorney General of Utah from 1917 to 1921 and as the United States Attorney for the District of Utah from 1933 to 1949.

He died on January 4, 1970, in Salt Lake City, Utah at age 91.

References

1878 births
1970 deaths
Utah Attorneys General
United States Attorneys for the District of Utah
Utah Democrats